Lewis Yeung Chi Lun (born 20 November 1989 in Hong Kong) is a former Hong Kong professional footballer who currently plays for Hong Kong First Division club Metro Gallery.

Club career

Early career
Yeung studied at Yan Chai Hospital Tung Chi Ying Memorial Secondary School, which is a school notable for impressive football results in the inter-school competitions. He helped the school win the inter-school football Jing Ying competition champions three times, and was awards the MVP of the tournament in 2007–2008.

Yeung was a member of Rangers youth academy. He then joined Hong Kong 09 in 2007.

Citizen
Yeung joined Hong Kong First Division League club Citizen in 2008. He scored 3 league goals in his debut season when he was only 19 years old.

Rangers
He returned to Rangers in July 2012. However, due to lack of match playing chance, he chose to leave the club in the winter transfer window.

Sun Hei
Yeung joined fellow First Division club Sun Hei in January 2013. He helped the club avoid relegation to the Second Division, although he was sent off on the last league matchday against South China.

Happy Valley
Yeung joined newly promoted First Division club Happy Valley on a free transfer.

Tai Po
Following Rangers' relegation from the HKPL after the 2017–18 season, Yeung remarked that there was no point in staying given the quality of the club. He was announced as a Tai Po player on 31 July 2018.

Career statistics

Club
 As of 4 May 2013

Notes
1.  Others include Hong Kong Season Play-offs.

Honours

Club
Tai Po
 Hong Kong Premier League: 2018–19

References

External links
 
 

Living people
1989 births
Association football midfielders
Hong Kong footballers
Hong Kong First Division League players
Hong Kong Premier League players
Citizen AA players
Hong Kong Rangers FC players
Sun Hei SC players
Happy Valley AA players
TSW Pegasus FC players
Tai Po FC players
Hong Kong League XI representative players